Prasad Panda  is a Canadian politician who was elected to the Legislative Assembly of Alberta in a 2015 by-election, replacing former Alberta Premier Jim Prentice, and the 2019 Alberta general elections to represent the electoral district of Calgary-Foothills. He is a member of the United Conservative Party. With his party forming majority government Panda joined the Executive Council of Alberta as the Minister of Infrastructure beginning on April 30, 2019.

In the by-election to the 29th Alberta Legislature, Panda was a member of the Wildrose Party and defeated former Calgary city councillor and Alberta NDP MLA Bob Hawkesworth by 1598 votes, winning 38.3% of all votes cast. In 2017, joined the United Conservative Party and became the party's energy critic. Panda introduced Motion 505, a resolution calling on the federal government to ban the import of oil from countries with a poor human rights or environmental record, and to facilitate pipelines within Canada to ensure better prices for Alberta oil.

Electoral history

Calgary-Foothills

Calgary-Northern Hills

References

Wildrose Party MLAs
Politicians from Calgary
Living people

Year of birth uncertain
Canadian engineers
21st-century Canadian politicians
Canadian politicians of Indian descent
United Conservative Party MLAs
Members of the Executive Council of Alberta
Year of birth missing (living people)